{{DISPLAYTITLE:C15H24N2O2}}
The molecular formula C15H24N2O2 (molar mass: 264.363 g/mol) may refer to:

 Oxymatrine
 Tetracaine, or amethocaine

Molecular formulas